Olympique de Paris was a French association football team based in Paris which existed from 1908 to 1926. Founded with the name Olympique de Pantin, it won the Coupe de France in 1918 and played in the finals in 1919 and 1921. It merged with Red Star Saint-Ouen in 1926.

History

Names
 1908–1918 – Olympique de Pantin
 1918–1926 – Olympique de Paris

Honours
 Coupe de France
 Winner: 1918
 Runner-up: 1919, 1921
Tournoi du Nouvel An
Winners (1): 1925
Tournoi de Pâques
Winners (1): 1925
Tournoi de Pentecôte de Paris
Runners-up (1): 1925

References

Defunct football clubs in France
Association football clubs established in 1895
Association football clubs disestablished in 1926
Football clubs in Paris
1895 establishments in France
1926 disestablishments in France